Eyralpenus diplosticta is a moth of the family Erebidae. It was described by George Hampson in 1900. It is found in Angola, the Democratic Republic of the Congo, Malawi, Mozambique, South Africa, Tanzania and Zambia.

The larvae feed on Gardenia globesa and Clerodendrum glabrum.

References

 

Spilosomina
Moths described in 1900
Moths of Sub-Saharan Africa